Thupaba Dewi was an Ava princess who became a queen consort of King Razadarit of Hanthawaddy.

Brief
She was born Min Hla Myat to Saw Beza and King Swa Saw Ke of Ava. She was the youngest of three children and had two elder brothers Min Swe and Theiddat. She was born in or after 1376. She was also known by the title of Thupaba Dewi (Pali: Supabha Devi).

In 1403, her eldest brother, now King Minkhaung I, gave her to King Razadarit of Hanthawaddy in a marriage of state.

Notes

References

Bibliography
 
 
 
 

Ava dynasty
Hanthawaddy dynasty